Maranga Island is the westernmost of the Anagram Islands, lying on the south side of French Passage in the Wilhelm Archipelago, Antarctica. It was named by the UK Antarctic Place-Names Committee in 1961 in association with the Anagram Islands, "maranga" being an anagram of "Anagram".

See also 
 List of Antarctic and sub-Antarctic islands

References

Islands of the Wilhelm Archipelago